Baaloul (in Arabic بعلول, . Tr B'alūl) is a town located in the western Bekaa Valley Lebanon.

Geography
Baaloul lies within the upper Litani river basin and is located along a mountainous area bordering Mount Lebanon. It is primarily agricultural and is bounded by the village of Lala to the northeast, and the village of Karaoun to southwest. The current population is approximately 200 native people from the village, considering that many residents live abroad. The community lies in a religiously diverse district that contains both Christian and Muslim families.

History
In 1838, Eli Smith noted Baaloul's population being predominantly Sunni muslims. However, as of 1982 at the heart of the Lebanese Civil War, statistics indicated that the population included both Christians and Muslims.

This town is known for being one of the many marked by emigration from Lebanon. The first wave of migration that emerged in Baaloul was during the 1890-1910 period, prior to Lebanese independence and during the Ottoman rule of Lebanon. Consequently the early immigrants were classified as Turks or Turcos by the authorities of the countries they migrated to.

The second displacement of its inhabitants began during the 1970s, when the country was facing the beginning of a power struggle in the political and social field between the various Muslim and Christian factions. Finally this struggle resulted in the start of the Lebanese Civil War (1975 - 1990). The situation in the country was unstable and a sluggish economy and an increasingly bloody civil war prevented raising their children there; therefore, many people decided to migrate again.

The people emigrated mainly to countries in Latin America, among which are: Colombia, Venezuela, Brazil and Panama; there were also significant numbers who moved to Canada and US. These migrations are mostly round trips: after achieving stable economic support in those countries, the immigrant population of Baaloul returned to dedicate themselves to building homes for their families.

Colombia was one of the main destinations of emigration. During the 1970, 1980 and 1990 the Department of Colombian Guajira, specifically the population of Maicao was one of the places where the community was established. Today you can see a strong presence of migrants from Baaloul in the area.

Venezuela is another of the destination countries, with the Isla Margarita and the Economic Zone Paraguaná in the city of Punto Fijo where migrants are highly concentrated, focusing mainly on the trade of dry goods.

Panama in the 1980s and 1990 received the community of Baaloul, which focused on the Colon Free Zone, on the outskirts of Panama Canal and conducted trade and business in the locality.

Brazil is one of the countries with the largest Lebanese communities around the world, even higher than the current population of Lebanon. Baaloul villagers are in the triple border Foz do Iguacu in the Province of Parana.

Today, the population of Baaloul ranks twenty-four family surnames The Major Familes of Baaloul include, David, Assaf, Darwiche, Kardi, Issa and others
These families joined entirely to a population of more than 1,200 people.

The official language of Lebanon is Arabic, and French as the second language; however, in Baaloul, the main language spoken by the community, both inside the town and beyond is Spanish, given the number of emigrants to Spanish-speaking countries. After Spanish, the most widely used languages are Arabic, English and Portuguese.

References

Bibliography

External links
Baaloul, Localiban

Populated places in Western Beqaa District
Sunni Muslim communities in Lebanon
Maronite Christian communities in Lebanon